The Countess of Baton Rouge is a romantic comedy film by Canadian director André Forcier, released in 1997.

Synopsis 
The story begins in a contemporary Montreal theatre where a projectionist describes to director Rex Albert (Robin Aubert) that a ghostly spirit seems to be haunting his film. The story then flashes back to the 1960s when Rex was making his first film. One night he visits a freak show and meets Paula, a beautiful bearded lady (Geneviève Brouillette). For Rex it is love at first sight, so he is upset when she takes off to join a Cajun circus in Louisiana. A few months later, Rex races southward to become a human cannonball in the same circus. The story jumps back to the present to Rex's latest film, La Comtesse de Baton Rouge, a chronicle to his strange love affair with Paula. The film is another offbeat fantasy about characters that live on the margins of society from director André Forcier. The film's cast also includes Isabel Richer, David Boutin, Frédéric Desager, France Castel and Louise Marleau.

Awards
The film garnered several Genie Award nominations at the 18th Genie Awards, including Best Actor (Aubert), Best Supporting Actor (Desager), Best Supporting Actress (Castel) and Best Director (Forcier).

References

External links

1997 films
Canadian romantic comedy films
1997 romantic comedy films
Films set in Louisiana
Films directed by André Forcier
French-language Canadian films
1990s Canadian films